The sweet chestnut of Gölcük Highland is a very old chestnut tree in Izmir Province, western Turkey.  It is a registered natural monument of the country.

The chestnut tree is located at Gölcük Highland in Ödemiş district of Izmir Province. It is a sweet chestnut (Castanea sativa). Its age is dated to be about 600 years old.

The tree was registered a natural monument on September 27, 1994.

References

İzmir Province
Natural monuments of Turkey
Protected areas established in 1994
1994 establishments in Turkey
Ödemiş District
Individual trees in Turkey